Tasqeen Qadeer (born 18 April 1979) is a Pakistani former cricketer who played as a right-handed batter. She appeared in 19 One Day Internationals for Pakistan between 2005 and 2008. She played domestic cricket for Lahore.

References

External links
 
 

1979 births
Living people
Cricketers from Lahore
Pakistani women cricketers
Pakistan One Day International cricketers
Lahore women cricketers